Finis H. Little was a state legislator in Mississippi. A Republican, he served during the Reconstruction era. He served with F. M. Abbott from the 22nd District. He served as president pro tem of the state senate and chaired its finance committee.

He served as an officer with a unit of the Union Army from Kentucky during the American Civil War.

According to one account, he was part of a planned march of African American Republicans that was faced down by armed white supremacists allied with the Democratic Party. In 1875 he wrote seeking protection for Republican voters in areas where they were a great majority, expressing his expectation of intimidation and Democratic Party control over polling. In 1875 he also conveyed a message from the Republican Caucus of Mississippi to President Ulysses Grant seeking a change in the federal official overseeing U.S. Marshals in the area. He described how whites in Aberdeen, Mississippi in Monroe County welcomed Klansmen home as heroes and lawyers offered them their services in defense against federal prosecution.

See also
Mississippi Plan

References

Republican Party Mississippi state senators
19th-century American politicians
People of Kentucky in the American Civil War
Union Army officers